Fort Allen, officially Fort Allen Training Center, is a Puerto Rico National Guard military installation located on a 921-acre facility in Juana Díaz, Puerto Rico.

History

Losey Field was established by the Army Air Corps in 1941 and was used during World War II by fighter & bomber units. It was named for Captain Robert M. Losey, an aeronautical meteorologist who in April 1940 became the United States' first military casualty in World War II. Units assigned were:
 4th Tactical Reconnaissance Squadron (13th Composite Wing, 72nd Observation Group) 1 April 1941 – 27 October 1943
 20th Troop Carrier Squadron (Sixth Air Force Base Command) 10 May–June 1942
 36th Fighter Group (Headquarters), January 1941-May 1943
 22d Fighter Squadron, 6 January-13 December 1941 (P-40 Warhawk)
 23rd Fighter Squadron, 6 January-31 May 1941; 15 November-13 December 1941(P-40 Warhawk)
 32d Fighter Squadron, 6 January 1941-19 February 1942; 9 March-14 June 1943 (P-40 Warhawk)
 417th Bombardment Squadron (25th Bombardment Group) 29 May 1943 – 24 March 1944 (B-18 Bolo)

Subsequently:
 1944: After the departure of the 417th Bombardment Squadron in 1944, the airfield was turned over to Army ground forces.
 1949: Losey Army Airfield was transferred to United States Army (USA) ground forces and became Camp Losey.
 1950: Camp Losey was renamed Fort Allen.
 1959: Fort Allen was transferred to the Army's Caribbean Signal Agency.
 1963: The United States Navy (USN) took control of the military post and redesignated as Naval Radio Station Fort Allen, Puerto Rico.
 1970: The Headquarters & Communications Center of Naval Communication Station (NAVCOMMSTA) Puerto Rico relocated from San Juan to Fort Allen.
 1980: The U.S. Navy moved the Naval Communication Station Puerto Rico Headquarters & Communication Center from Fort Allen to Naval Station Roosevelt Roads.
 1980: On 16 November 1980 Fort Allen became the home for the United States Army Reserve (USAR) 35th Expeditionary Signal Battalion.
 1981: The United States Immigration and Naturalization Service (INS) under a presidential order reconfigured Fort Allen as a processing center for Cuban and Haitian refugees.
 1983: Fort Allen was officially transferred to the Puerto Rico National Guard (PRNG).  The 35th Signal Battalion, along with other U.S. Army Reserve units remain as tenants.
 1985: The Puerto Rico National Guard Language Center (PRNGLC) relocated to Fort Allen.
 1997: The U.S. Navy built a receiver site for the Relocatable Over-the-horizon radar (ROTHR) on government land at Fort Allen.
 1999: The National Guard Youth Challenge Program was established on post.
 2007: Soldiers from the 35th Signal Battalion, 1st Mission Support Command, were deployed from Fort Allen to support Operation Iraqi Freedom and Operation Enduring Freedom.
 2011: The Fort Allen Armed Forces Reserve Center (AFRC) was inaugurated and dedicated posthumously to the 6th Adjutant General of the Puerto Rico National Guard and founder of the Language Center at Fort Allen, Major General Salvador Padilla Escabi.

Current use
Since the Navy left Fort Allen in 1980 there's been no regular Active Duty military personnel assigned on post, but the Puerto Rico Army National Guard and U.S. Army Reserve do have permanent Active Guard Reserve personnel present. Fort Allen, while still a federally-owned facility, is operated by the Puerto Rico National Guard (PRNG). Its mission is educational in scope and that of providing support to the Puerto Rico Army National Guard and Army Reserve units stationed in southern Puerto Rico. There is not a Commissary at Fort Allen but NGX operates a PX on base for authorized patrons.

Units and tenant units

 Army National Guard 
191st Regional Support Group
 240th Military Police Company
 192nd Support Battalion, C Company (Med)
 105th Quartermaster Company
 482nd Chemical Company
 714th Quartermaster Company

LTC Hernan G Pesquera U.S. Army Reserve Center
LTC Hernan G. Pesquera United States Army Reserve Center (USARC) is located on 40 acres within the grounds of Fort Allen, Puerto Rico. This facility is named after Army Reserve Lieutenant Colonel and federal judge Hernan Gregorio Pesquera.

Units at the LTC Hernan G. Pesquera United States Army Reserve Center (USARC)
 United States Army Reserve
 35th Expeditionary Signal Battalion Headquarters and Headquarters Company (HHC)
 204 Transportation MDM Truck Company (POL 5K) (EAB LINEHAUL)
 276th Maintenance Support Company

Armed Forces Reserve Center
On March 4, 2011 a  Armed Forces Reserve Center (AFRC) was inaugurated at Fort Allen to relocate the U.S. Army Reserve 8th Multifunctional of the 180th Division and retention office. The Puerto Rico Army National Guard 201st Regiment Multifunctional Training Brigade was located to the Fort Allen Armed Forces Reserve Center. A  Unheated storage building was also built. It also has a fitness room, locker rooms, weapons simulator, classrooms and private offices and an armory/vault. The Fort Allen Armed Forces Reserve Center can accommodate 150 Guard and Reserve Soldiers on a rotating basis, 126 military personnel per weekend.

This facility was dedicated posthumously to the 6th Adjutant General of the Puerto Rico National Guard (PRNG) and founder of the Language Center at Fort Allen, Major General Salvador Padilla Escabi.

Officer Candidate School, NCO Academy & Language Center
The Puerto Rico Army National Guard Officer Candidate School, NCO Academy and the Language Center for the Puerto Rico Army and Air National Guard recruits are located at Fort Allen.

Over-the-horizon radar

Youth Challenge Program
The National Guard Youth Challenge Program Community Outreach Youth Program came aboard to Fort Allen in 1999 to intervene and reclaim the lives of 16- to 18-year-old high school dropouts, producing program graduates with the values, life skills, education, and self-discipline necessary to succeed as productive citizens. Participants of the Youth Challenge Program live in Fort Allen during the program.

See also

Army National Guard
Puerto Rico National Guard
Losey Field
Military of Puerto Rico

References

Bibliography

 Maurer, Maurer (1983). Air Force Combat Units Of World War II. Maxwell AFB, Alabama: Office of Air Force History. .

External links
 http://www.ngycp.org/state/pr_es/contactus.php
 http://www.navy-radio.com/commsta/puerto-rico.htm
 http://www2.webster.edu/~corbetre/haiti-archive/msg09149.html
Fort Allen at GlobalSecurity.org
 Losey Airfield photos 
 Abandoned & Little-Known Airfields:Western Puerto Rico

Juana Díaz, Puerto Rico
Installations of the United States Army National Guard
Allen, Puerto Rico
Military installations established in 1941
Military facilities in Puerto Rico
1941 establishments in Puerto Rico